The 2020 Portland City Commission elections were held on May 19, 2020 and November 3, 2020 with a special election on August 11, 2020.

3 positions were up for election. Positions 1 and 2 were open due to the retirement of Amanda Fritz and the death of Nick Fish respectively. Position 4 was held by Chloe Eudaly who lost re-election.

Portland has no term-limits on officeholders.

Position 1 
Incumbent Amanda Fritz announced that she would retire at the end of her term. Carmen Rubio received more than 50% of the vote in the primary and therefore won outright without needing to advance to the run-off.

Position 2 
A special election was called due to the death of Nick Fish. The special primary was held in conjunction with the other primaries on May 19, 2020. The run-off election was held on August 11, 2020. Dan Ryan won the run-off election.

Position 4 
Incumbent Chloe Eudaly won the primary election but lost in the run-off to Mingus Mapps.

References 

Government of Portland, Oregon
Portland, Oregon City Commission
Portland, Oregon City Commission